Skins is an American teen comedy-drama television series that premiered on January 17, 2011, on MTV in the United States. It is a remake of the original UK show of the same name, and follows the lives of a group of teenagers in Toronto, Canada, through their final two years of high school. As with the UK series, the American version features a cast of amateur actors and young writers.

The series generated controversy in the United States over its sexual content, in which several advertisers withdrew and there were some accusations of child pornography since most of its cast members were under the age of 18. On June 9, 2011, MTV announced that they would not renew Skins for a second season, with a statement that "Skins is a global television phenomenon that, unfortunately, did not connect with a U.S. audience as much as we had hoped. We admire the work that the series creator Bryan Elsley did in adapting the show for MTV, and appreciate the core audience that embraced it."

Cast and characters  

The characters in the American version are the same as those in the UK version, although some first names have been changed and all last names have been changed except for Michelle Richardson. The biggest change comes in the form of new character Tea Marvelli, a lesbian cheerleader who replaces the UK character Maxxie Oliver.

 James Newman as Tony Schneider (styled on Tony Stonem of the original UK version)
Tony begins the season as the leader of the group, but as his relationship with Michelle starts to crumble due to cheating on her with Tea, his popularity and power within the group crumbles as well. He ends the series with the realization that his friends, particularly Stanley, and his sister Eura mean more to him than he actually thought.
 Rachel Thevenard as Michelle Richardson
In the beginning of the season Michelle is in a relationship with Tony, which causes her to act like she enjoys the role of the good-looking girlfriend and ignore her real feelings. Upon discovery of Tony's affair, she struggles to find herself and confides in Stanley, who has been in love with her for as long as he can remember. She concludes the season choosing Stanley over Tony, finally realizing what is best for her.
 Daniel Flaherty as Stanley Lucerne (styled on Sid Jenkins of the original UK version)
Stanley is lazy and insecure, and often is overshadowed by Tony, his best friend and role model. Stanley finally begins to find his voice in "Stanley", when he brings up the courage to stand up to his father, who is so demanding and self-centered that he drives away Stanley's mother. Stanley spends much of the season in love with Michelle, but soon finds himself torn between his feelings for her and Cadie. In the end Stanley chooses Michelle.
 Sofia Black-D'Elia as Tea Marvelli (styled on Maxxie Oliver of the original UK version)
Tea is confident, smart, and at times confused about who she is. Tea is a lesbian, but soon finds herself questioning her sexuality by sleeping with Tony on two separate occasions. When Michelle finds out, her friendship with Michelle and relationship with Tony are broken off. At the end she chooses Betty, a girl who had been trying to start a relationship with her for most of the season.
 Ron Mustafaa as Abbud Siddiqui (styled on Anwar Kharral of the original UK version)
Abbud is a funny and caring person. He is in love with Tea for half of the season, and then spends the remaining few episodes with feelings for Daisy, with whom he has started a "friends with benefits" type of relationship. Abbud is best friends with Chris, who he takes in after his parents desert him and Tina is forced to leave town.
 Jesse Carere as Chris Collins (styled on Chris Miles of the original UK version)
Chris is the party animal of the group. He is loud, energetic, and at a lot of times, either drunk or high on either weed or some type of pill. After his mom abandons for good with nothing more than $1,000, Chris finds hospitality with Tina, who he starts up a relationship with, and then Abbud.
 Britne Oldford as Cadie Campbell (styled on Cassie Ainsworth of the original UK version)
Cadie is bipolar, depressed, suicidal, and anorexic. She begins the season with strong feelings for Stanley, but then loses interest. She finds a boyfriend midway through the season, and ends it with feelings for Stanley, but ultimately chooses to let him go for Michelle, knowing it is what is best for him.
 Camille Cresencia-Mills as Daisy Valero (styled on Jal Fazer of the original UK version)
Daisy is the one who often has to fix everyone else's problems. She eventually gets fed up with everybody, and tells everybody to stop asking her for help. Her mother left her, and she lives with her father and younger sister, Deedee. She is a talented trumpeter and has dreams of becoming a professional. She becomes friends with benefits with Abbud.
 Eleanor Zichy as Eura Schneider (styled on Effy Stonem of the original UK version)
Eura is Tony's younger sister, and does not speak. She enjoys partying and drinking, and Tony often helps her sneak in and out of the house. The audience does not hear her voice until the season finale.

Minor characters 
 Ali Kazmi as Abbud's uncle
 Anastasia Phillips as Tina Nolan, a school teacher (styled on Angie of the original UK series)
 David Reale as Dave, a schoolteacher.
 Randall Blaine Morris as Betty, a love interest for Tea
 Natalie Brown as Cadie's 41-year-old mother, a former model
 Paulino Nunes as Marco Marvelli, Tea's father
 Tony Sims as Jason Morrison, a friend of Chris Collins

Episodes 
The first and the third episodes are both almost shot-for-shot remakes of their UK counterpart, but the U.S. show deviates from the UK show's plot in subsequent episodes.

Production

Development 
Elsley said he was first approached on making a U.S. adaptation by MTV's Liz Gateley and Tony DiSanto. Elsley said that at the time he didn't feel that a U.S. version would work. Several network and cable channels also approached Elsley about a North American adaptation. Elsley said "at that end of that time it seemed clear that MTV had the clearest vision." He added "[the other networks] were missing a commitment to the core values of the show. Which is to say that MTV is clearly taking a risk with this show and they were prepared to take that risk."

In early 2009, Elsley began finding writers for the North American version. Elsley said "We started at the top of the Hollywood tree and worked our way down, and it wasn't until we got to the bottom that we actually found writers we liked. We started saying to agents, 'Who have you just taken on? Who's got a great play on somewhere?' And that turned up just incredible writers that have never done anything." After reading 400 scripts around the clock, a team of six was formed.

Casting 

Open casting calls were held in New York City. Six of the nine main cast members had never acted before. Elsley said "It's very important to us that the kids are not seasoned professionals" in keeping with UK version where most had no prior acting experience.

James Newman, who plays Tony Snyder, was urged to audition for Skins by his older brother. Newman missed the audition but attended a later audition where he won the role. Ron Mustafaa, who plays Abbud Siddiqui, went to the open call for the show because his mother was a big fan of Dev Patel (who plays Abbud's UK Skins equivalent), Anwar, and wanted Mustafaa to "be the next Slumdog."

Filming 
The show production began in mid 2010 in Toronto, changed from the initially planned location of Baltimore.

Reception

Critical response 
Metacritic gives the series a weighted average score of 57% based on reviews from 17 critics, indicating "mixed or average reviews".

James Poniewozik of Time magazine concluded that the show is tamer than the British original, but believes if the controversial subject matter leaves parents reaching for antacid, then the show is doing its job. Although the show is raunchy, Poniewozik judges Skins to have "more sweetness than snarky teen soaps like Gossip Girl". He questions if this American remake of a British show will be able to find its American voice, but commends the strong source material. He calls the show "unsettling, flawed but ambitious" and credits it with the secret that "it wears its heart on its skin".

Troy Patterson of Slate describes the show as a "sporadically excellent adaption" that is "superior teensploitation, enabling youth to rejoice in the fantasy of their corruption". He admonishes those who call the show child pornography, scolding them for "trivializing terrible crimes with flabby language" and judges it to be more an indication of the show's success that it angers some parents and sets itself on the far side of a generation gap.

Controversy 
The show has garnered controversy from various conservative groups for its teenage depictions of casual sex and drug use, especially with regard to underage actors. In the wake of a mounting scandal over a possible child pornography investigation of MTV as a result of the show's content, Yum! Brands (Taco Bell), Mars, Incorporated (Wrigley), General Motors, Doctor's Associates (Subway), Foot Locker, H&R Block, Schick, Guthy-Renker (Proactiv), L'Oréal, Reckitt Benckiser (Clearasil) and Kraft all opted to pull their advertising from the program.

Additionally, the conservative television activist group the Parents Television Council filed a letter to the Department of Justice, asking them to bring a child pornography charge against the series, alleging a violation of 18 USC 1466A.

Due to the controversy in the U.S. and because the show is made in Canada, Bob Tarantino, an entertainment and intellectual property lawyer, reviewed section 163.1 of the Canadian Criminal Code and found that "it would be exceedingly unlikely that Skins would be found to constitute 'child pornography' for purposes of Canadian criminal law."

In 2011, MTV rated the series "TV-MA", meaning that it is unsuitable for viewers under the age of 17. Nielsen reported that 1.2 million of the premiere episode's 3 million viewers were under the age of 18. MTV told advertisers, "Now is the time to influence their choices." They also defended the show, stating that it addresses "real-world issues" teenagers are confronted with on a daily basis, and in a "frank" way. "We are confident that the episodes of Skins will not only comply with all applicable legal requirements, but also with our responsibilities to our viewers," they said.

Ratings 
The series debut had 3.26 million viewers, with a 3.4 rating and 2.7 million viewers in the 12-34 demo, the most viewers in that demo for a show launch in MTV history. However, its demo rating was down 55% from its lead-in, Jersey Shore, which drew 7.7 million viewers. The second episode dropped to 1.6 million viewers, with a 1.0 share and 1.4 million viewers in the key demo. The third episode did not fare much better, dipping to 1.5 million viewers. Episodes 4 through 10 averaged about 1 million viewers, peaking at 1.2 million for episode 4 and hitting its lowest point at 0.962 million for episode 5. The last four episodes (7 through 10) got 1.170, 1.088, 1.107 and 1.2 million viewers respectively.

Cancellation 
On June 9, it was announced that MTV had canceled Skins because it wasn't connecting to the U.S. audience, in addition to the controversy that went with it. Elsley defended the show's content as not so much controversial, "but a serious attempt to get in the roots of young people's lives."

References

External links 
 

2010s American LGBT-related drama television series
2010s American high school television series
2010s American teen drama television series
2011 American television series debuts
2011 American television series endings
American television series based on British television series
Casting controversies in television
Coming-of-age television shows
English-language television shows
MTV original programming
Television controversies in the United States
Obscenity controversies in television
Television series about teenagers
Television series by All3Media
Television series by Entertainment One
Television shows filmed in Toronto
Television shows set in Baltimore